Dwight Jason Freeney (born February 19, 1980) is an American former football player who played as a defensive end and outside linebacker for 16 seasons in the National Football League (NFL). He played college football at Syracuse University, where he earned unanimous All-American honors, and was drafted by the Indianapolis Colts in the first round of the 2002 NFL Draft. With the Colts, Freeney won Super Bowl XLI over the Chicago Bears, and made seven Pro Bowls. He also played for the San Diego Chargers, Arizona Cardinals, Atlanta Falcons, Seattle Seahawks and Detroit Lions.

Early years
Freeney was born in Hartford, Connecticut.  He attended Bloomfield High School in Bloomfield, Connecticut. Freeney was a four-sport letterman, earning four letters in baseball in which he was coached by Alphonso Ford; four in basketball; three in football, in which he played both ways; and one in soccer, in which he played goalie in his freshman year before switching over to football. Freeney holds the record for sacks at his high school and used to hold the record for most sacks in a high school career in the Connecticut record book. (Record now held by Mark Evanchick of Darien HS) Bloomfield High retired his No. 44 football jersey. During his youth, Freeney idolized New York Giants linebacker Lawrence Taylor.

College career
Freeney received an athletic scholarship to attend Syracuse University, where he played for the Syracuse Orange football team from 1998 to 2001. A two-year starter for the Orangemen, he set a school record with 17.5 sacks in his senior season and his 34 career sacks rank second in school history to Tim Green (45.5).  Freeney was the school's premier pass rusher, and once had a string of 17 consecutive games with at least one sack. Against Virginia Tech, Freeney sacked elusive Hokies quarterback Michael Vick 4.5 times in one game.

Freeney finished his college career with 104 tackles (68 unassisted), 34 quarterback sacks, 51 tackles for a loss, and 43 quarterback pressures.  He was a first-team All-Big East Conference selection in 2000 and 2001, and was recognized as a unanimous first-team All-American following his senior season in 2001.

While attending Syracuse at a then 255-pounds, Freeney was clocked at 4.40 seconds during his 40-yard dash, and recorded 40-inch vertical jump. His 40-yard time remains among the fastest ever recorded for a defensive lineman.

Freeney still returns to Syracuse for his summer workouts, and serves as mentor to Syracuse players.

Freeney was inducted into the 2023 class of College Football Hall of Fame, becaming the 10th Syracuse player to be selected for the honor.

Professional career

2002 NFL Combine

Indianapolis Colts
Freeney was selected by the Indianapolis Colts with the 11th selection in the 2002 NFL Draft. He set an NFL rookie record in 2002 with 9 forced fumbles, three of which occurred in a single game against former Syracuse football player, Donovan McNabb. Freeney was the runner up for the NFL Defensive Rookie of the Year award.

When drafted by Indianapolis at 270 lbs, Freeney was clocked at 4.48 seconds in the 40-yard dash and the same 40 inch vertical jump.

In 2004, Freeney's third season, he led the NFL with 16 sacks. At the end of his third season, Freeney's season marked him as the 3rd fastest player to achieve 40 sacks. He developed a spin move which became his trademark pass rush move.

In 2006, Freeney helped the Colts defeat the Chicago Bears in Super Bowl XLI to become NFL Champions.

On February 19, 2007, the Colts placed the franchise tag on Freeney following the expiration of his rookie contract. This move allowed Bill Polian and the Colts front office time to work on a long term contract. On July 13, 2007, Freeney signed a six-year, $72 million contract with $30 million in guarantees making Freeney one of the highest paid defensive players in the NFL.

Freeney was fined $20,000 by the NFL for his expletive-laced interview following the end of the Colts 2008–09 playoff campaign which ended with a 23-17 overtime playoff loss to the San Diego Chargers. The NFL cited Freeney for making "inappropriate comments on officiating," according to the Indianapolis Star. Freeney, frustrated by the three defensive penalties incurred as the Chargers made their game-winning drive, told Yahoo! Sports after the game: "Those were the worst [expletive] calls I've seen in a long time ... To have a game of that magnitude taken out of your hands, it's just disgusting. It's not like they made one [expletive] bad call -- it's three calls, in overtime ... They need to start investigating some other [expletive]."

In 2012, Freeney converted from defensive end to outside linebacker under new head coach Chuck Pagano. Due to injury and not adjusting to his position-change well, Freeney struggled and finished the season with only five sacks and 12 tackles.

On February 15, 2013, Freeney was told he would not be re-signed by the Colts. Freeney left as the all-time franchise leader in sacks with 107.5, but was surpassed by former teammate Robert Mathis the next season. Mathis would also break Freeney's franchise season record of 16 sacks the following season, too, when he tallied 19.5.

San Diego Chargers
On May 18, 2013, Freeney signed a two-year deal with the San Diego Chargers. During the 2013 season, Freeney suffered a season-ending injury and recorded a career low with 0.5 sacks.

In 2014, Freeney looked to bounce back from the previous year and did. Throughout the season, Freeney was only used as a pass rush specialist coming out only on passing downs. Against the Seattle Seahawks Freeney sacked Russell Wilson, which contributed to a Chargers victory. The next week, Freeney got a sack against the Buffalo Bills. Against the 49ers, Dwight Freeney and Ricardo Mathews sacked and forced a Colin Kaepernick fumble leading to a Chargers touchdown. The next week recorded one sack against Chase Daniel and the Chiefs. Freeney finished the season with 10 tackles, 3.5 sacks, and a pass deflect.

Arizona Cardinals
On October 12, 2015, Freeney signed a one-year, $870,000 deal with the Arizona Cardinals, with the incentive to receive a $200,000 bonus with four sacks and then would receive $100,000 for each sack thereafter, with a maximum of 12.

Freeney was named NFC Defensive Player of the Week for Week 16, in which he had three sacks and a forced fumble, the first time he had three sacks in a game since 2006. Coincidentally, former Colts teammate Robert Mathis won AFC Defensive Player of the Week for the same week. Freeney appeared in nine games during the 2015 season, totaling 8.0 sacks (leading the team) and three forced fumbles.

Atlanta Falcons

On August 2, 2016, Freeney signed a one-year deal with the Atlanta Falcons. He played in 15 games, totaling three sacks. The Falcons won the NFC Championship to advance to Super Bowl LI, bringing Freeney to his third career Super Bowl. Freeney had one sack in the big game, although the Falcons lost to the Patriots by a score of 34–28.

Seattle Seahawks
On October 24, 2017, Freeney signed a one-year deal with the Seattle Seahawks. After playing in four games recording three sacks, Freeney was released by the Seahawks on November 21, 2017.

Detroit Lions
On November 22, 2017, Freeney was claimed off waivers by the Detroit Lions.

Retirement
Freeney announced his retirement on April 19, 2018, after signing a ceremonial one-day contract with the Colts to retire as a member of the team he spent the majority of his career with.

NFL career statistics

Personal life
On March 28, 2012, Freeney's financial advisor was arrested and charged with embezzling $2.2 million from Freeney. In 2015, Freeney sued Bank of America for $20 million, claiming he trusted the bank's wealth management division with the assets.

References

External links

 
 
  Indianapolis Colts bio
 San Diego Chargers bio
  Syracuse Orange bio

1980 births
Living people
People from Bloomfield, Connecticut
Players of American football from Hartford, Connecticut
American football defensive ends
American football linebackers
Syracuse Orange football players
All-American college football players
Indianapolis Colts players
San Diego Chargers players
Arizona Cardinals players
Atlanta Falcons players
Seattle Seahawks players
Detroit Lions players
American Conference Pro Bowl players
Bloomfield High School (Connecticut) alumni
100 Sacks Club
Ed Block Courage Award recipients